2-Furanone is a heterocyclic organic compound. It is also known as γ-crotonolactone (GCL), as it is formally the lactone derived from γ-hydroxyisocrotonic acid. The chemical is colloquially called "butenolide", and is the parent structure for the butenolide class of compounds. It is a colourless liquid.

Synthesis and reactions
2-Furanone is prepared by oxidation of furfural:

It exists in equilibrium with the tautomer 2-hydroxyfuran, which serves as an intermediate in the interconversion between the β- and α-furanones. The β form is the more stable.  The interconversion is catalyzed by base.

2-Furanones can be converted to furans by a two-step process of reduction followed by dehydration.

See also
 :Category:Furanones, various substituted structural analogs
 Pyrone, which has one more carbon atom in the ring

References

Furanones
GHB receptor ligands